, meaning nuclear power plant earthquake disaster (from the two words Genpatsu – nuclear power plant – and Shinsai – earthquake disaster) is a term which was coined by Japanese seismologist Professor Katsuhiko Ishibashi in 1997. It describes a domino effect scenario in which a major earthquake causes a severe accident at a nuclear power plant near a major population centre, resulting in an uncontrollable release of radiation in which the radiation levels make damage control and rescue impossible, and earthquake damage severely impedes the evacuation of the population. Ishibashi envisages that such an event would have a global impact and a 'fatal' effect on Japan, seriously affecting future generations.

In Japan, Ishibashi believes that a number of nuclear power stations could be involved in such a scenario, but that the Hamaoka Nuclear Power Plant, located near the centre of the expected Tōkai earthquakes, is the most likely candidate. He is also concerned that a similar scenario could take place elsewhere in the world. As a result, he believes that the matter should be a global concern.

See also
Nuclear power in Japan
Fukushima Daiichi nuclear disaster
2011 Japanese nuclear accidents
Nuclear power
Nuclear power debate
Lists of nuclear disasters and radioactive incidents
Seismicity in Japan
International Nuclear Event Scale

External links
 Katsuhiko Ishibashi: "Why worry? Japan's nuclear plants at grave risk from quake damage" The Asia-Pacific Journal: Japan Focus (August 11, 2007)
Michael Reilly: "Insight: Where not to build nuclear power stations" (preview only) New Scientist (July 28, 2007).

References

Nuclear power in Japan
Nuclear power
Nuclear safety and security
Nuclear accidents and incidents
Earthquakes in Japan
Japanese words and phrases
Fukushima Daiichi nuclear disaster